Campbellsburg can refer to a place in the United States:
Campbellsburg, Indiana
Campbellsburg, Kentucky